The Fashion Outlets of Santa Fe is an outdoor shopping mall owned by CBRE Group in Santa Fe, New Mexico. The shopping center is the sole outlet mall for the state of New Mexico, and one of three malls within the city.

Background
The Santa Fe Factory Outlets was curated by California based developer Steve Craig of Ginsburg Craig and Associates in 1990. At the time, the shopping center was one of two outlet malls simultaneously being developed within the state. The New Mexico Outlet Center also opened a complex in Budaghers, New Mexico in 1993.

History

1993-2016
Ginsburg Craig and Associates developed the first phase of the center by 1993, and announced a second and third phase would follow. The first phase of the project cost $8 million to develop. In 1997, the property owners Chelsea GCA Realty partnered with Michigan based Horizon Group Inc. Horizon Group also owned and operated nearby New Mexico Outlet Center. Following the partnership, several tenants from the Budaghers shopping center relocated to the Santa Fe Factory Outlets.  A few years later, the Albuquerque-based reality company Gulfstream Group purchased the property. The new owners would change the name to Santa Fe Premium Outlets. In 2007, Talisman Cos. LLC purchased the property for $9.3 million and acquired several new tenants. In 2009, the shopping center added a Nike Factory Outlet store as an anchor. Nike quietly closed the location in 2016.

2017-present
The property owners faced a foreclosure lawsuit with the lender over a $11 million loan default.

Tenants
 Polo Ralph Lauren Factory Store
Eddie Bauer
Hanes Brand Outlet
Levi’s
Merrell
Eye Associates
Sunglass Hut
Sweet Santa Fe

References

External links
 

Shopping malls in New Mexico
Buildings and structures in Santa Fe, New Mexico
Outlet malls in the United States